Émile Torcheboeuf (17 July 1876 – 29 November 1950) was a French long jumper who competed in the late 19th century and early 20th century. He participated in Athletics at the 1900 Summer Olympics in Paris and won the bronze medal in the men's standing long jump.

References

External links
 

1876 births
1950 deaths
French male long jumpers
Olympic athletes of France
Athletes (track and field) at the 1900 Summer Olympics
Olympic bronze medalists for France
Medalists at the 1900 Summer Olympics
Olympic bronze medalists in athletics (track and field)
People from Saint-Ouen-sur-Seine
Sportspeople from Seine-Saint-Denis